Valentines High School is a coeducational secondary school and sixth form located in the Ilford area of the London Borough of Redbridge, England. It has approximately 1300 pupils and 93 teachers. Valentines has been a teaching school since 2011, and is a member of the Leading Edge partnership programme. In 2006, it was designated as a specialist school for technology and had technology college status.

History
The school was first opened in 1901 as the Park Higher Grade School, a coeducational secondary school, located at the opposite side of Valentines Park from the school's present location. The school had over 600 places and taught Latin and French among other subjects.

In 1929, the girls' wing of the school was moved to a new building on Cranbrook Road and was named Ilford County High School for Girls, a selective grammar school for girls, while the original site became known as Ilford County High School for Boys, which in 1935 moved to its present-day location in Barkingside. In 1977, the school was renamed Valentines High School, and became coeducational, admitting boys for the first time the following year.

In 2007, a new sixth-form building was opened with state-of-the-art physical education facilities including a new astro-turf pitch, tennis courts, sports hall, and drama studio. The sixth-form building currently houses the modern languages, and humanities departments. Following demographic changes to the local area, the school has become very multicultural, with more than 80% of pupils speaking a first language other than English.

The current headteacher, Mr Richard Laws, took over as acting Headteacher in 2014, taking over from Mrs Sylvia Jones, who was Headteacher for over 10 years. The former PE teacher has put an emphasis on "discipline, respect and good behaviour" and considerably reduced the size of the sixth form.

Currently, the school is extremely culturally and ethnically diverse. Over three-quarters of the school's students speak English as an additional language, while the proportion of students eligible for free school meals is above the national average.

Results
The school was last inspected by Ofsted in 2021, when it was graded 'outstanding' in every category.

In 2022, 73% of students achieved Grade 5 or above in English and Maths GCSEs, placing the school in the top-bracket of non-selective schools.

Notable former pupils 
Bolu Babalola, writer
Nina Bawden, CBE novelist and children's writer
 Marion Foale, artist and fashion designer
 Rebecca Front, BAFTA award-winning actress, the Thick of It, Lewis and Humans
 Dawn Neesom, editor of the Daily Star from 2003 to 2018
 Hussain Manawer, astronaut

References

External links
Valentines High School

Secondary schools in the London Borough of Redbridge
Community schools in the London Borough of Redbridge
Ilford